The traditional Chinese calendar divides a year into 24 solar terms. Dàshǔ, Taisho, Daeseo, or Đại thử (Chinese and Japanese: 大暑; pinyin: dàshǔ; rōmaji: taisho; Korean: 대서; romaja: daeseo; Vietnamese: đại thử; "major heat") is the 12th solar term. It begins when the Sun reaches the celestial longitude of 120° and ends when it reaches the longitude of 135°. It more often refers in particular to the day when the Sun is exactly at the celestial longitude of 120°. In the Gregorian calendar, it usually begins around 22 July (23 July Chinese lunisolar calendar time) and ends around 7 August.

Date and time

References

12
Summer